I'm Alan Partridge is a British sitcom written by Steve Coogan, Peter Baynham and Armando Iannucci. Coogan stars as Alan Partridge, a tactless and inept radio DJ and television presenter who has been left by his wife and dropped from the BBC. The show follows Partridge as he lives alone in a roadside hotel and presents a graveyard slot on local Norwich radio, all the while desperately pitching ideas for new television shows.

Two series of six episodes each (12 in total) were broadcast five years apart. Series 1 was released in late 1997, while a second series followed in 2002, with Partridge now living in a static caravan after recovering from an off-screen mental breakdown. Iannucci said the writers used the sitcom as "a kind of social X-ray of male middle-aged Middle England."

Supporting Coogan in the cast are Felicity Montagu as his faithful but timid personal assistant, Lynn Benfield; Simon Greenall as Geordie handyman Michael; and Phil Cornwell as Partridge's rival DJ Dave Clifton. Series 2 also featured Amelia Bullmore as Partridge's Ukrainian girlfriend Sonja.

The show received critical acclaim and was a success amongst audiences, being nominated for three BAFTAs (winning two), two British Comedy Awards (winning both), and a Royal Television Society award. In a list drawn up by the British Film Institute in 2000, voted by industry professionals, I'm Alan Partridge was named the 38th-best British television series of all time.

Episodes were shot on tape with hand-held cameras to achieve a single-camera, documentary feel to the show. Interior scenes were made in a studio, with closed-wall sets and a live audience.

Premise
Alan Partridge was created by Steve Coogan and producer Armando Iannucci for the 1991 BBC Radio 4 comedy programme On the Hour, a spoof of British current affairs broadcasting, as the show's sports presenter. In 1992, Partridge hosted a spin-off Radio 4 spoof chat show, Knowing Me, Knowing You with Alan Partridge. On the Hour transferred to television as The Day Today in 1994, followed by Knowing Me, Knowing You later that year. The series ends with Partridge accidentally shooting a guest.

I'm Alan Partridge follows Partridge after he has been left by his wife and dropped from the BBC. In the first series, he lives in a roadside hotel, presents a graveyard slot on local Norwich radio, and desperately pitches ideas for new television shows. In the second series (2002), Partridge lives in a static caravan with his new Ukrainian girlfriend after recovering from a mental breakdown. The writers found the second series difficult to make, feeling it had been too long since the first and that expectations for sitcoms had changed. Iannucci said the writers used I'm Alan Partridge as "a kind of social X-ray of male middle-aged Middle England".

Episodes

Series 1 (1997)

Series 2 (2002)

Reception 
I'm Alan Partridge won the 1998 BAFTA awards for Comedy Performance and Comedy Programme or Series. Digital Spy wrote: "the character of Partridge hit his comic peak" in I'm Alan Partridge. Entertainment Weekly described the show as "bleakly hilarious". The Telegraph named I'm Alan Partridge as one of the 10 best TV sitcoms of all time. In a poll of British comedians conducted by the TV channel Gold, it was named as the second-best British sitcom of all time. In a 2017 poll of over 100 comedians, a scene from I'm Alan Partridge in which Partridge goes to the home of an obsessive fan was voted best comedy scene.

Awards and nominations

References

External links

Unofficial Linton Travel Tavern website
 Filming locations from I'm Alan Partridge

1997 British television series debuts
2002 British television series endings
1990s British sitcoms
2000s British sitcoms
BBC television sitcoms
English-language television shows
Television series about television
Television series by Fremantle (company)
Television shows set in Cambridgeshire
Television shows set in Norfolk
British workplace comedy television series